Matthew Jamison may refer to:

Matthew Jamison of Henry Jackson Society
Matt Jamison, fictional character in The Leftovers